The 2020 Cleveland Indians season was the 120th season for the franchise. It was the eighth season under the leadership of manager Terry Francona and fifth under general manager Mike Chernoff. The Indians play their home games at Progressive Field in Cleveland, Ohio. They made the playoffs after missing them in 2019 and improved upon their previous year's record of 93–69. They were swept out of the playoffs, losing both games of the Wild Card Series to the New York Yankees, extending their postseason losing streak to eight games.

On March 12, 2020, MLB announced that because of the ongoing COVID-19 pandemic, the start of the regular season would be delayed by at least two weeks in addition to the remainder of spring training being cancelled. Four days later, it was announced that the start of the season would be pushed back indefinitely due to the recommendation made by the CDC to restrict events of more than 50 people for eight weeks. On June 23, commissioner Rob Manfred unilaterally implemented a 60-game season. Players reported to training camps on July 1 in order to participate in "summer camp" and prepare for a July 24 Opening Day.

Season standings

American League Central

American League Wild Card

Record against opponents

Game log

Regular season

|- style="background:#bfb
| 1 || July 24 || Royals || 2–0 || Bieber (1–0) || Duffy (0–1) || Hand (1) || 1–0 || W1
|- style="background:#fbb
| 2 || July 25 || Royals || 2–3  || Barlow (1–0) || Karinchak (0–1) || Holland (1) || 1–1 || L1
|- style="background:#bfb
| 3 || July 26 || Royals || 9–2 || Carrasco (1–0) || Bolaños (0–1) || — || 2–1 || W1
|- style="background:#bbb
| – || July 27 || White Sox || colspan=7| Postponed (rain). Makeup date: July 28.
|- style="background:#bfb;"
| 4 || July 28 || White Sox || 4–3 || Civale (1–0) || Cease (0–1) || Hand (2) || 3–1 || W2
|- style="background:#bfb;"
| 5 || July 28 || White Sox || 5–3 || Plutko (1–0) || Rodón (0–1) || Hill (1) || 4–1 || W3
|- style="background:#fbb;"
| 6 || July 29 || White Sox || 0–4 || Bummer (1–0) || Hand (0–1) || — || 4–2 || L1
|- style="background:#bfb;"
| 7 || July 30 || @ Twins || 2–0 || Bieber (2–0) || Berríos (0–1) || Karinchak (1) || 5–2 || W1
|- style="background:#fbb;"
| 8 || July 31 || @ Twins || 1–4 || Dobnak (1–1) || Clevinger (0–1) || Rogers (2) || 5–3 || L1
|-

|- style="background:#fbb;"
| 9 || August 1 || @ Twins || 0–3 || Maeda (2–0) || Carrasco (1–1) || Rogers (3) || 5–4 || L2
|- style="background:#fbb;"
| 10 || August 2 || @ Twins || 1–3 || Smeltzer (1–0) || Civale (1–1) || Romo (2) || 5–5 || L3
|- style="background:#fbb;"
| 11 || August 3 || @ Reds || 2–3 || Gray (3–0) || Plesac (0–1) || Iglesias (1) || 5–6 || L4
|- style="background:#cfc;"
| 12 || August 4 || @ Reds || 4–2 || Bieber (3–0) || Jones (0–1) || Hand (3) || 6–6 || W1
|- style="background:#cfc;"
| 13 || August 5 || Reds || 2–0 || Clevinger (1–1) || Antone (0–1) || Hand (4) || 7–6 || W2
|- style="background: #cfc;"
| 14 || August 6 || Reds || 13–0 || Carrasco (2–1) || Castillo (0–2) || — || 8–6 || W3
|- style="background:#fbb;"
| 15 || August 7 || @ White Sox || 0–2 || Cease (2–1) || Civale (1–2) || Colomé (4) || 8–7 || L1
|- style="background:#cfc;"
| 16 || August 8 || @ White Sox || 7–1 || Plesac (1–1) || Anderson (0–1) || — || 9–7 || W1
|- style="background:#cfc;"
| 17 || August 9 || @ White Sox || 5–4  || Maton (1–0) || Cordero (0–1) || Pérez (1) || 10–7 || W2
|- style="background:#fbb;"
| 18 || August 11 || Cubs || 1–7 || Lester (2–0) || Plutko (0–1) || — || 10–8 || L1
|- style="background:#fbb;"
| 19 || August 12 || Cubs || 2–7 || Hendricks (3–1) || Carrasco (2–2) || — || 10–9 || L2
|- style="background:#cfc;"
| 20 || August 14 || @ Tigers || 10–5 || Civale (2–2) || Nova (1–1) || — || 11–9 || W1
|- style="background:#cfc;"
| 21 || August 15 || @ Tigers || 3–1 || Bieber (4–0) || Turnbull (2–1) || Hand (5) || 12–9 || W2
|- style="background:#cfc;"
| 22 || August 16 || @ Tigers || 8–5 || Pérez (1–0) || Schreiber (0–1) || — || 13–9 || W3
|- style="background:#cfc;"
| 23 || August 18 || @ Pirates || 6–3  || Wittgren (1–0) || Howard (1–1) || Hand (6)  || 14–9 || W4
|- style="background:#cfc;"
| 24 || August 19 || @ Pirates || 6–1 || Civale (3–2) || Neverauskas (0–3) || — || 15–9 || W5
|- style="background:#cfc;"
| 25 || August 20 || @ Pirates || 2–0 || Bieber (5–0) || Williams (1–4) || Hand (7) || 16–9 || W6
|- style="background:#fbb;"
| 26 || August 21 || Tigers || 5–10 || García (1–0) || Plutko (1–2) || — || 16–10 || L1
|- style="background:#cfc;"
| 27 || August 22 || Tigers || 6–1 || McKenzie (1–0) || Boyd (0–4) || — || 17–10 || W1
|- style="background:#fbb;"
| 28 || August 23 || Tigers || 4–7 || Norris (2–1) || Carrasco (2–3) || — || 17–11 || L1
|- style="background:#fbb;"
| 29 || August 24 || Twins || 2–3 || Maeda (4–0) || Civale (3–3) || Rogers (7) || 17–12 || L2
|- style="background:#cfc;"
| 30 || August 25 || Twins || 4–2 || Bieber (6–0) || Alcalá (1–1) || Hand (8) || 18–12 || W1
|- style="background:#cfc;"
| 31 || August 26 || Twins || 6–3 || Maton (2–0) || Romo (0–1) || Hand (9)  || 19–12 || W2
|- style="background:#cfc;"
| 32 || August 28 || @ Cardinals || 14–2 || Hill (1–0) || Ponce de Leon (0–3) || Plutko (1) || 20–12 || W3
|- style="background:#cfc;"
| 33 || August 29 || @ Cardinals || 2–1  || Wittgren (2–0) || Reyes (1–1) || Hand (10) || 21–12 || W4
|- style="background:#fbb;"
| 34 || August 30 || @ Cardinals || 2–7 || Wainwright (3–0) || Civale (3–4) || — || 21–13 || L1
|- style="background:#fbb;"
| 35 || August 31 || @ Royals || 1–2 || Barlow (2–1) || Karinchak (0–2) || Holland (2) || 21–14 || L2
|-

|- style="background:#bfb;"
| 36 || September 1 || @ Royals || 10–1 || Plesac (2–1) || Harvey (0–2) || — || 22–14 || W1
|- style="background:#bfb;"
| 37 || September 2 || @ Royals || 5–0 || McKenzie (2–0) || Junis (0–1) || — || 23–14 || W2
|- style="background:#fbb;"
| 38 || September 4 || Brewers || 1–7 || Burnes (2–0) || Maton (2–1) || — || 23–15 || L1
|- style="background:#cfc;"
| 39 || September 5 || Brewers || 4–3 || Hand (1–1) || Hader (0–1) || — || 24–15 || W1
|- style="background:#cfc;"
| 40 || September 6 || Brewers || 4–1 || Bieber (7–0) || Anderson (2–3) || Hand (11) || 25–15 || W2
|- style="background:#cfc;"
| 41 || September 7 || Royals || 5–2 || Plesac (3–1) || Keller (3–2) || Hand (12) || 26–15 || W3
|- style="background:#fbb;"
| 42 || September 8 || Royals || 5–8 || Holland (3–0) || Cimber (0–1) || Barlow (2) || 26–16 || L1
|- style="background:#fbb;"
| 43 || September 9 || Royals || 0–3 || Duffy (3–3) || Carrasco (2–4) || Holland (3) || 26–17 || L2
|- style="background:#fbb;"
| 44 || September 10 || Royals || 1–11 || Singer (2–4) || Civale (3–5) || — || 26–18 || L3
|- style="background:#fbb;"
| 45 || September 11 || @ Twins || 1–3 || Maeda (5–1) || Bieber (7–1) || Rogers (9) || 26–19 || L4
|- style="background:#fbb;"
| 46 || September 12 || @ Twins || 4–8 || Hill (2–1) || Plesac (3–2) || — || 26–20 || L5 
|- style="background:#fbb;"
| 47 || September 13 || @ Twins || 5–7 || Thielbar (2–0) || McKenzie (2–1) || Romo (4) || 26–21 || L6
|- style="background:#fbb;"
| 48 || September 15 || @ Cubs || 5–6 || Jeffress (4–1) || Pérez (1–1) || — || 26–22 || L7
|- style="background:#fbb;"
| 49 || September 16 || @ Cubs || 2–3  || Adam (2–1) || Maton (2–2) || — || 26–23 || L8
|- style="background:#cfc;"
| 50 || September 17 || @ Tigers || 10–3 || Bieber (8–1) || Mize (0–2) || — || 27–23 || W1
|- style="background:#cfc;"
| 51 || September 18 || @ Tigers || 1–0 || Plesac (4–2) || Alexander (2–2) || Hand (13) || 28–23 || W2
|- style="background:#fbb;"
| 52 || September 19 || @ Tigers || 2–5 || Cisnero (3–3) || Maton (2–3) || Garcia (3) || 28–24 || L1
|- style="background:#cfc;"
| 53 || September 20 || @ Tigers || 7–4 || Carrasco (3–4) || Boyd (2–7) || — || 29–24 || W1
|- style="background:#cfc;"
| 54 || September 21 || White Sox || 7–4 || Civale (4–5) || Fry (0–1) || Hand (14) || 30–24 || W2
|- style="background:#cfc;"
| 55 || September 22 || White Sox || 5–3  || Maton (3–3) || Foster (5–1) || — || 31–24 || W3
|- style="background:#cfc;"
| 56 || September 23 || White Sox || 3–2 || Hand (2–1) || González (1–2) || — || 32–24 || W4
|- style="background:#cfc;"
| 57 || September 24 || White Sox || 5–4 || Hill (2–0) || Rodón (0–2) || Hand (15) || 33–24 || W5
|- style="background:#cfc;"
| 58 || September 25 || Pirates || 4–3 || Plutko (2–2) || Stratton (2–1) || — || 34–24 || W6
|- style="background:#fbb;"
| 59 || September 26 || Pirates || 0–8 || Musgrove (1–5) || Civale (4–6) || — || 34–25 || L1
|- style="background:#cfc;"
| 60 || September 27 || Pirates || 8–6 || Karinchak (1–2) || Turley (0–3) || Hand (16) || 35–25 || W1
|-

| Legend:       = Win       = Loss       = PostponementBold = Indians team member

Postseason

|-style="background:#fbb;"
| 1 || September 29 || Yankees || 3–12 || Cole (1–0) || Bieber (0–1) || — || 0–1
|-style="background:#fbb;"
| 2 || September 30 || Yankees || 9–10 || Chapman (1–0) || Hand (0–1) || — || 0–2
|-

Postseason rosters

| style="text-align:left" |
Pitchers: 26 Triston McKenzie 27 Cam Hill 33 Brad Hand 34 Zach Plesac 38 Cal Quantrill 39 Óliver Pérez 43 Aaron Civale 57 Shane Bieber 59 Carlos Carrasco 62 Nick Wittgren 88 Phil Maton 90 Adam Cimber 99 James Karinchak
Catchers: 9 Sandy León 17 Austin Hedges 55 Roberto Pérez 
Infielders: 6 Mike Freeman 7 César Hernández 11 José Ramírez 12 Francisco Lindor 41 Carlos Santana 
Outfielders: 0 Delino DeShields Jr. 4 Bradley Zimmer 8 Jordan Luplow 30 Tyler Naquin 31 Josh Naylor 35 Oscar Mercado
Designated hitters: 32 Franmil Reyes
|- valign="top"

Player stats

Batting
Note: G = Games played; AB = At bats; R = Runs scored; H = Hits; 2B = Doubles; 3B = Triples; HR = Home runs; RBI = Runs batted in; AVG = Batting average; SB = Stolen bases

Pitching
Note: W = Wins; L = Losses; ERA = Earned run average; G = Games pitched; GS = Games started; SV = Saves; IP = Innings pitched; H = Hits allowed; R = Runs allowed; ER = Earned runs allowed; BB = Walks allowed; K = Strikeouts

Roster

Farm system

References

External links
Cleveland Indians 2020 Schedule at MLB.com
2020 Cleveland Indians season at Baseball Reference

Cleveland Guardians seasons
Cleveland
Cleveland Indians